Arcadio Julio López (September 15, 1910 – April 12, 1972) was an Argentine football defender who played for Argentina in the 1934 FIFA World Cup. He played for many clubs, including Club Atlético Lanús (1931-1934 and 1942), Club Sportivo Buenos Aires (1934-1935), Ferro Carril Oeste (1935-1937) and Boca Juniors (1938-1942).
He was coach substitute of the Boca Juniors in 1963, in the match Boca Juniors 1–Universidad de Chile 0 in the Copa Libertadores.

Fifa World Cup Career

References

External links
FIFA profile

Argentine footballers
Argentina international footballers
1934 FIFA World Cup players
1910 births
1972 deaths
Association football midfielders
Footballers from Buenos Aires